Demetrida pallens is a species of ground beetle in Lebiinae subfamily. It was described by Darlington in 1968 and is found in Indonesia and New Guinea.

References

Beetles described in 1968
Beetles of Papua New Guinea
Beetles of Indonesia
pallens